Helgi the Sharp may refer to:

 Helgi the Sharp (Zealand)
 Helgi the Sharp (Ringerike)